Joseph Dixon (24 September 1916 – 2001) was an English footballer who played as a centre-forward for Audley United, Northampton Town, Port Vale, and Witton Albion.

Career
Dixon played for non-League side Audley United and Football League Third Division South club Northampton Town, before joining Port Vale, also of the Third Division South, in October 1946. His debut came on Christmas Day 1946, in a goalless draw at Aldershot. This was to be his only game for the club however, as he was transferred to Witton Albion in March 1947. He scored five goals in three games in what remained of the 1946–47 season.

Career statistics
Source:

References

Sportspeople from Newcastle-under-Lyme
English footballers
Association football forwards
Northampton Town F.C. players
Port Vale F.C. players
Witton Albion F.C. players
English Football League players
1916 births
2001 deaths